Konstadinos Gatsioudis (born 17 December 1973) is a retired Greek track and field athlete who competed in the javelin throw. His personal best throw of 91.69 m, achieved in 2000, is the Greek record.

Born in Didymoteicho, Gatsioudis set a world junior record in 1990 and eight national records during his career. He was named the 1997 Greek Male Athlete of the Year.

International competitions

Seasonal bests by year
1990 - 69.90
1992 - 80.30
1993 - 78.44
1994 - 83.82
1995 - 82.70
1996 - 87.12
1997 - 89.22
1998 - 88.13
1999 - 89.84
2000 - 91.69
2001 - 91.27
2002 - 91.23
2006 - 75.40

External links

1973 births
Living people
Greek male javelin throwers
Athletes (track and field) at the 1996 Summer Olympics
Athletes (track and field) at the 2000 Summer Olympics
Olympic athletes of Greece
World Athletics Championships medalists
World Athletics Championships athletes for Greece
People from Didymoteicho
Mediterranean Games gold medalists for Greece
Mediterranean Games bronze medalists for Greece
Mediterranean Games medalists in athletics
Athletes (track and field) at the 1993 Mediterranean Games
Athletes (track and field) at the 1997 Mediterranean Games
Sportspeople from Eastern Macedonia and Thrace